Ilo Monteiro da Fonseca (born July 18, 1930) is a former Olympic backstroke swimmer from Brazil, who participated in two Summer Olympics for his native country.

Biography
Fonesca started swimming at the age of nine and turned professional. His club was Botafogo.

At the 1948 Summer Olympics in London, he swam the 100-metre backstroke, not reaching the finals. At the inaugural Pan American Games in 1951, in Buenos Aires, Argentina, he finished 5th in the 100-metre backstroke. At the 1952 Summer Olympics in Helsinki, he swam the 100-metre backstroke, not reaching the finals.

On 2011, Ilo was the South American record holder of the 50-metre freestyle in his age group.

References

1930 births
Living people
Brazilian male backstroke swimmers
Swimmers at the 1948 Summer Olympics
Swimmers at the 1951 Pan American Games
Swimmers at the 1952 Summer Olympics
Olympic swimmers of Brazil
Pan American Games competitors for Brazil